The Hilaal-e-Imtiaz, also spelled and transliterated as Hilāl-e-Imtiyāz, is the second-highest (in the hierarchy of "Hilal") civilian award and honour given to both civilians and military officers of the Pakistan Armed Forces by the Government of Pakistan. It recognises individuals who have made an "especially meritorious contribution to the security or national interests of Pakistan, world peace, cultural or other significant public endeavors". It is a civilian award, and not limited to the citizens of Pakistan.

The honour is restricted to individuals who have made outstanding contributions in their fields that led to international recognition for the state. It is awarded in the fields of literature, arts, sports, medicine and science for civilians. It is announced every year on Independence Day (14 August), and given on Pakistan Day, 23 March, by the President of Pakistan. 

For officers in the military, it is given for distinguished service. The first Hilal e Imtiaz Military in the history of Pakistan was awarded by PM ZA Bhutto to 4 star General Zia ul Haq after Zia was appointed Chief of the Army in 1976. Initially awarded exclusively to officers reporting directly to the Secretary of Defense, after 1979 it began to be award in a new format to officers who were up to two steps removed from the Secretary of Defense, such as Major General or Lieutenant General (Army), Air Vice-Marshals or Air Marshals (Air Force) and Rear-Admiral or Vice-Admiral (Navy, Coast Guard, and Marines). The Parliament's committee for award and recognition services selects the names of individuals and sends their report to the prime minister; on his advice, the president announces the awards in a ceremony that is broadcast by PTV. The award is usually given to individuals, not groups, because the purpose of the award is to recognise the recipients' individual contributions.

The award is a disc of golden jasminum between the five points of a pure gold star. The star has additional bright jasminum; in its centre there is a green emerald with a golden crescent.

A special grade of the medal has a larger execution of the same medal design worn as a star on the left of the chest. In addition, it is worn as a sash on the right shoulder, with its rosette (yellow with white for civilians and green for military officers) and white and yellow edge bearing the central disc of the medal at its centre, resting on the left hip. At the ceremony, both medals can be worn at the same time according to their achievements. The medal is suspended on a dark green ribbon with a light yellow and white central stripe and white edge stripes.

Military officers who receive the award are given a Non-Prohibited Bore Arms License.

Grades of the Order of Imtiaz 

This award is the 2nd Grade in the Order of Imtiaz (Excellence). The four Grades in the Order of Imtiaz are:

 Nishan-e-Imtiaz (Order of Excellence)
 Hilal-e-Imtiaz (Crescent of Excellence)
 Sitara-e-Imtiaz (Star of Excellence)
 Tamgha-e-Imtiaz (Medal of Excellence).

Service Ribbon Insignia 
The ribbon for the Hilal-e-Imtiaz (Civilian) is:

 Yellow with a white centre band and a narrow Pakistan Green stripe in the middle.

The ribbon for the 'Hilal-e-Imtiaz (Military)' is:

 White edges with Pakistan Green centre band and a single white stripe in the middle.

Recipients 

 Li Xiaopeng (2022) Minister of Transport of the People's Republic of China
 Rohail Hyatt (2021)
 Major General Rashid Mahmood (Director General Pakistan Ordnance Factories Wah Cantt) 
 Dr. Qamar Mehboob (2021) 
 Tahir Ikram (2021) 
 Jamshed Azim Hashmi (2021) 
 Kishwar Naheed (2021)  
 Dr.Asif Mahmood Jah (2021)
Lieutenant General Mohammad Asad Durrani (Director General Inter-Services Intelligence)
 Abdul Bari Khan (2019)
Zaheer Ayub Baig (2019)
Ghulam Asghar (2019)
Tasawar Hayat (2019)
Wasim Akram (2019)
Waqar Younis (2019)
Recep Akdag (Turkey-2019)
 Dr Michael Jansen (Germany-2019)
Hussain Dawood (Business and Philanthropy) (2018)
Rear Admiral Moazzam Ilyas (2015)
Anwar Maqsood (Scriptwriter) (2013)
Faiz Hameed (general) (2013)
Abida Parveen (musician and Sufi music performer) (2013)
Josh Malihabadi (1894–1982) Urdu poet (2013)
Abdul Hafeez Kardar (1925–1996) former Pakistan Cricket Team captain (2013)
Ansar Burney (Human and civil rights activist) (2013)
Zia Mohyeddin (actor, television anchor and broadcaster) (2013)
Azhar Abbas (journalist) (2013)
Khalid Abbas Dar (actor, playwright, anchor, entertainer, director, theatre producer, mimic) (2013)
Abdul Halim Mohd Hanifah (Royal Brunei Navy commander) (2012)
Muhammad Iqbal Choudhary (Organic chemist) (2007)
Iftikhar Arif (poet, scholar and literary critic) (2006)
Ashfaq Ahmed (1925–2004) (writer, playwright and television broadcaster) (2006)
Halbi Mohd Yusof (Royal Brunei Armed Forces commander) (2006)
Faridullah Khan (politician) (2005)
Mushtaq Ahmed Yousfi (writer) (2002)
Jansher Khan (Squash Legend) (1997)
 Imran Khan (Sports) 1992
Dr. A. Q. Khan (Nuclear scientist) 1989 
Munir Ahmad Khan (Nuclear Science) 1989
Major General Mukhtar Hussain Shah (Military) 1988
Major General Muhammad Ikram Cheema (Military) 1987
Lieutenant General Mian Muhammad Afzaal (Shaheed) (Military) 1987
Hamoodur Rahman (academic) 1984
Ruth Pfau (Humanitarian) 1979
Major General S A Nawab (Military) 1979
Admiral Mohammad Shariff (Military) 1979
General Zia ul Haq (Military) 1976

See also
 Civil decorations of Pakistan

References

External links
 Decorations and Medals of Pakistan

Civil awards and decorations of Pakistan
Recipients of Hilal-i-Imtiaz
Military awards and decorations of Pakistan